Generation Cross is an American religious comedy television series created and hosted by Lino Rulli. The show's name is derived from "Generation X", showing individuals from that generation expressing their Catholic faith in a humorous manner. It premiered in September 1998 on Metro Cable Network in Minneapolis–Saint Paul, Minnesota. Before its cancellation in 2004, it was syndicated on various religious television networks in the United States, including CatholicTV. It was also broadcast in various Catholic dioceses, via the Catholic Communication Campaign.

Format
Generation Cross consists of host Lino Rulli doing various unique activities while imparting Catholic history, theology, and inspiration in a comedic manner. Activities have include exploring villages in Italy, rock climbing with a priest, and swing dancing with a nun.

Awards

References

External links

Television shows about Catholicism
Television in Minnesota
1998 American television series debuts
2004 American television series endings